Tenth Street Bridge may refer to:
Tenth Street Bridge (Pittsburgh, Pennsylvania)
Tenth Street Bridge (Great Falls, Montana)